Gerardo Diego Cendoya (October 3, 1896 – July 8, 1987) was a Spanish poet, a member of the Generation of '27.

Diego taught language and literature at institutes of learning in Soria, Gijón, Santander and Madrid. He also acted as literary and music critic for several newspapers.

Biography
Diego was born in Santander. He studied the subjects of Philosophy & Humanities at the University of Deusto, and later at the universities of Salamanca and Madrid, where he earned his doctorate. With Juan Larrea, he founded the Ultraísta Movement in 1919.
He was professor of literature and music. He began his poetic work with El romancero de la novia (1920).

After discovering the Chilean poet Vicente Huidobro, founder of the Creationist movement, Diego became one of the most enthusiastic followers of Creacionismo. The extensive poetic work of Diego has always varied between the themes and expressions of Vanguardism and the more classical structures of poetry. In 1925, he was awarded the National Prize for Literature for his book Versos humanos. He began to publish the journal Carmen y Lola, of Vanguardist character, in 1927. In 1932 he published Poesía española contemporánea. He was elected to the Spanish Royal Academy in 1947. His lifetime accomplishment was recognised with the Cervantes Prize in 1979.

He died in Madrid, in 1987, aged 90.

See also
 Café Gijón (Madrid)

External links
 Fundación Gerardo Diego (in Spanish)

1896 births
1987 deaths
People from Santander, Spain
Writers from Cantabria
Members of the Royal Spanish Academy
Premio Cervantes winners
Spanish people of the Spanish Civil War (National faction)
Falangists
Generation of '27
Spanish male poets
20th-century Spanish poets
University of Salamanca alumni
20th-century Spanish male writers